In Brazil magazine publishing started in 1812 when the first Brazilian magazine, As Variedades, was established. The market is dominated by national firms. In 2007 there were 3,833 consumer magazines in the country, whereas the number was 3,915 in 2008. The number of B2B magazines was 1,898 in 2007. In 2014 the magazine market in the country was described as one of the higher-growth, larger-scale markets.

In the country the circulation of magazines is audited by the Instituto Verificador de Comunicação (IVC). Brazilian magazines do not enjoy higher levels of circulation.

The following is an incomplete list of current and defunct magazines published in Brazil. They may be published in Portuguese or in other languages.

A
 Ação Games
 Atlantida

B
 Billboard Brasil
 Bundas

C

 Canal Contemporâneo
 Caras
 Careta
 Caros Amigos
 CartaCapital
 Ciência e Cultura
 Ciência Hoje
 Ciência Popular
 Cinearte
 Clima
 Clube do Hardware
 ComCiência
 Cultura
 Cultura Política

E

 Época
 Escrever Cinema
 Estética
 Exame

F
 Focus
 Fon-Fon!
 Fundamentos

G
 G Magazine
 Gibi
 Galileu

I
 Info Exame
 ISTOÉ

K
 Klaxon

M
 Manchete
 Minha Casa
 Mundo Estranho

N
 Nintendo World
 Nova
 Nova Escola

O

 O Cruzeiro
 O Lampião da Esquina
 O Malho
 O Tico-Tico

P

 Pessoa
 Piauí
 Placar
 Playboy
 Problemas

Q
 Quatro Rodas

R
 Realidade
 Revista Autismo
 Revista da Folha

S
 Salada Paulista
 Senhor
 Superinteressante

V
 Veja

See also
 List of newspapers in Brazil

References

Brazil
Lists of mass media in Brazil